The men's 20 kilometres walk at the 2010 African Championships in Athletics was held on August 1.

Results

External links
Results

2010 African Championships in Athletics
Racewalking at the African Championships in Athletics